Slavko Linić (born 19 September 1949) is a Croatian politician and economist. He is a graduate of the Faculty of Economics on the University of Rijeka. From 1990 to 2000, he was the Mayor of Rijeka. From 2000 to 2003 he served as Deputy Prime Minister under Ivica Račan. From December 23, 2011 to May 6, 2014, he has been the Minister of Finance in the centre left Government of Zoran Milanović.

References

1949 births
Finance ministers of Croatia
Social Democratic Party of Croatia politicians
Mayors of Rijeka
Living people